Íñigo Rey Ortega (born May 19, 1984, in Mexico City, Mexico) is a former Mexican footballer who last played for Irapuato in the Ascenso MX league in Mexico.

Family
Rey is the third son of Ricardo Rey Bosch and Monica Ortega Kegel. In a relationship with Marimar

Career
In Apertura 2003 he began his career with club Puebla. His debut was against Pumas with a 1–1 draw. He has played  with  Puebla for 7 years from club's relegation in Clausura 2005 until promotion in Apertura 2008.
Currently working at Roche Bobois Santa Fe

External links

1984 births
Living people
Mexican footballers
Association football forwards
Club Puebla players
Tampico Madero F.C. footballers
Alacranes de Durango footballers
C.F. Mérida footballers
Irapuato F.C. footballers
Ballenas Galeana Morelos footballers
Liga MX players
Ascenso MX players
Footballers from Mexico City